A Rap on Race is a 1971 non-fiction book co-authored by the writer and social critic James Baldwin and the anthropologist Margaret Mead. It consists of transcripts of conversations held between them in August 1970.

Summary

The transcript mentions "New Guinea, South Africa, Women's Lib, the South, slavery, Christianity, their early childhood upbringings, Israel, the Arabs, the bomb, Paris, Istanbul, the English language, Huey Newton, John Wayne, the black bourgeoisie, Baldwin's 2-year-old grandnephew and Professor Mead's daughter." Baldwin and Mead intertwine these discussions with explorations of "identity, power and privilege, race and gender, beauty, religion, justice, and the relationship between the intellect and the imagination."

Literary significance and criticism
The book was dismissed as "the same old bilge you've heard from the fellow on the next stool to you in the saloon" by a reviewer at The New York Times when it was first published. More recently, writer Maria Popova called the book "a remarkable and prescient piece of the cultural record" and "a bittersweet testament to one of the recurring themes in their dialogue — our tendency to sideline the past as impertinent to the present, only to rediscover how central it is in understanding the driving forces of our world and harnessing them toward a better future."

References

1971 non-fiction books
Books by James Baldwin
Books by Margaret Mead
J. B. Lippincott & Co. books
Collaborative non-fiction books